Khvor castle is a historical castle located in Khusf County in South Khorasan Province, The longevity of this fortress dates back to the Safavid dynasty.

References 

Castles in Iran